Greenlawn is a historic mansion in Amite City, Louisiana, U.S.. It has been listed on the National Register of Historic Places since May 31, 1980.

References

Houses on the National Register of Historic Places in Louisiana
Queen Anne architecture in Louisiana
Renaissance Revival architecture in Louisiana
Houses completed in 1895
National Register of Historic Places in Tangipahoa Parish, Louisiana